Joos is a surname. Notable people with the surname include:

Amaat Joos (1855–1937), Belgian priest, educationalist, dialectologist and folklorist
Gustaaf Joos (1923–2004), Belgian Roman Catholic cardinal
Hildegard Joos (1909-2005), Austrian painter
Joseph Joos (1878–1965), German intellectual and politician
Martin Joos (1907–1978), American linguist and German professor
Peter Joos (born 1961), Belgian fencer
Stefan Joos (born 1963), Belgian fencer

See also
Joos (given name)